David G. H. Townsend (born 28 August 1955) is a British rower who competed in the 1976 Summer Olympics and in the 1980 Summer Olympics.

Rowing career
Townsend was part of the eight that at the 1975 World Rowing Championships in Nottingham, the crew finished 9th overall after a third-place finish in the B final. The following year he was a crew member of the British boat which finished twelfth in the coxless four event at the 1976 Olympic Games.

In 1978 along with John Beattie, Ian McNuff, and Martin Cross, he was a member of the British coxless four boat, coached by David Tanner which won the bronze medal in the World Rowing Championships at Lake Karapiro, New Zealand behind Russia and East Germany. The following year in 1979 along with John Beattie, Ian McNuff and Martin Cross he was a member of the British coxless four boat which won the bronze medal in the World Rowing Championships at Bled, Yugoslavia behind East Germany and Czechoslovakia. Coached by David Tanner

In the 1980 Moscow Olympics along with John Beattie, Ian McNuff and Martin Cross he was a crew member of the British boat (again coached by David Tanner) which won the bronze medal in the Olympic coxless fours event behind East Germany and Russia.

References

1955 births
Living people
British male rowers
Olympic rowers of Great Britain
Rowers at the 1976 Summer Olympics
Rowers at the 1980 Summer Olympics
Olympic bronze medallists for Great Britain
Olympic medalists in rowing
Medalists at the 1980 Summer Olympics
World Rowing Championships medalists for Great Britain
People educated at King's School, Worcester